The Betka River is a perennial river with no defined major catchment, located in the East Gippsland region of the Australian state of Victoria.

Course and features
The river descends  over its  course.

The scarce Callistemon kenmorrisonii or Betka Bottlebrush, which is found in one place along the river, draws its name from the river.

See also

 List of rivers of Australia

References

External links
 

East Gippsland catchment
Rivers of Gippsland (region)
Croajingolong National Park